Liily is a Los Angeles–based rock band formed in 2016. Their music has been described as alternative rock, with elements of post-punk and dance-punk.

History
Liily was formed in Los Angeles in 2016. Members include frontman Dylan Nash, guitarist Sam De La Torre, bassist Charlie Anastasi, and drummer Maxx Morando. The group met while attending music school. Morando was a former dummer of The Regrettes. 

In 2018, Liily released their debut single "Toro" on Flush Records. In 2019, the group released their EP I Can Fool Anybody in This Town. They subsequently toured in the United States and Europe, and played at festivals such as Lollapalooza and Bonnaroo. 

Liily began to work on their follow-up immediately after the release of I Can Fool Anybody in This Town. Much of the material was written in Joshua Tree National Park in January 2020. During the COVID-19 lockdowns, the bandmembers continued to work on material individually. In 2021, the album TV or Not TV was released on Flush Records. It marked a shift to a more intense, electronic influenced sound. The album was produced by Joe Chiccarelli.

In 2022, the band participated in Miley's New Year's Eve Party. The band is set to tour with Fidlar in the winter of 2023.

References

Musical groups from Los Angeles
American alternative rock groups
Musical groups established in 2016